Thalheim bei Wels is a town in the Wels-Land District in the Austrian state of Upper Austria.

Geography
It is situated on the right bank of the river Traun, opposite the city of Wels. About 11.6% of the municipality is forest, 69% is farmland.

Subdivisions
Bergerndorf
Edtholz
Ottstorf
Schauersberg
Thalheim bei Wels
Unterschauersberg

Population

Sights
Pilgrimage church Maria Schauersberg, consecrated around 1490.
Marienwarte, a 19th-century observation tower, offers a panorama of the surrounding country. On clear days, the Alps can be seen.

Personalities
Franz Kalchmair (b. 1939), an opera singer.

References

Cities and towns in Wels-Land District